Edwin Howard Friedman (May 17, 1932 – October 31, 1996) was an ordained rabbi, family therapist, and leadership consultant. He was born in New York City and worked for more than 35 years in the Washington, D.C., area, where he founded the Bethesda Jewish Congregation. His primary areas of work were in family therapy, congregational leadership (both Christian and Jewish), and leadership more generally.

Approach
Friedman's approach was primarily shaped by an understanding of family systems theory. His seminal work Generation to Generation, written for the leaders of religious congregations, focused on leaders developing three main areas of themselves:
 Being self differentiated
 Being non-anxious
 Being present with those one is leading
His contribution to intercultural communication and understanding in family therapy appears in a key essay, "The Myth of the Shiksa" (original 1982, collected 2008), using the concept of "cultural costume and camouflage" to describe the ways that people express their ethnic or cultural identity. This was elaborated in greater detail in the model of cultural family therapy in "Chapter 3: The Presenting Culture"  of A Stranger in the Family by family therapist and transcultural psychiatrist Vincenzo Di Nicola. Echoing cultural anthropologist Clifford Geertz's notion that humans exist through the mediating variable of culture, this model of cultural family therapy uses cultural costume and camouflage as a conceptual tool that Di Nicola calls Masks: "Each family, Friedman observed, draws its cultural camouflage from the available reportoire of their culture."

Self-differentiation
Building on his work, Generation to Generation, Friedman's family and friends published A Failure of Nerve--leadership in the age of the quick fix finishing Friedman's work on his understanding of leaders as "self-differentiated or well-differentiated."

Friedman illustrates good “self-differentiated” leadership to that present in the great Renaissance explorers, where leaders had:
 the capacity to separate oneself from surrounding emotional processes
 the capacity to obtain clarity about one’s principles and vision
 the willingness to be exposed and be vulnerable
 the persistence to face inertial resistance
 the self-regulation of emotions in the face of reactive sabotage.

Two concepts are critical in Friedman’s model: self-knowledge and self-control. Friedman attacks what he calls the failure of nerve in leaders who are “highly anxious risk-avoiders,” more concerned with good feelings than with progress–one whose life revolves around the axis of consensus. By self-differentiation, the leader maintains his/her integrity (a non-anxious self as opposed to an anxious non-self) and thus promotes “the integrity or prevents the dis-integration of the system he or she is leading."

In other places, Friedman argues that the well-differentiated leader:

Bibliography 
 Generation to Generation: Family Process in Church and Synagogue (New York: Guilford Press, 1985) 
 Friedman's Fables (New York: Guilford Press, 1990) 
 A Failure of Nerve:  Leadership in the Age of the Quick Fix (New York: Seabury, 1997) - posthumous 
 The Myth of the Shiksa and Other Essays (New York: Seabury, 2008) 
 What Are You Going to Do with Your Life? Unpublished Writings and Diaries (New York: Seabury, 2009)

DVD
 Reinventing Leadership (New York: Guilford, 2007)

See also 
 Murray Bowen

References 

20th-century American rabbis
1932 births
1996 deaths
Family therapists